Gbanu (Gbànù, Banu, Gbanou) is a Gbaya language of the Central African Republic. The people do not consider themselves to be ethnically Gbaya.

Phonology
Gbanu has 14 vowels, oral  and nasal . There are four tones on CV syllables, high, low, rising, and falling. Words have six tone patterns, those four plus dipping (falling–rising) and peaking (rising–falling). 

Nasal consonants lightly nasalize surrounding vowels, and nasal vowels, including those triggered by nasal consonants, nasalize the glottalized consonants. The approximants  do not occur with nasal vowels, and so may not be phonemic;  may be posited as the underlying phonemes.

References

Yves Moñino, 1995. "Phonologie de Gbanu". In Le Proto-Gbaya. Peeters, Paris

Gbaya languages
Languages of the Central African Republic
Languages of Cameroon